Delanggu Station (DL) is a class III railway station located in Gatak, Delanggu, Klaten Regency; at an altitude of +133 amsl; included in the Operational Region VI Yogyakarta. This station is the easternmost and northernmost station in Klaten regency.

This station was previously built by the Nederlandsch-Indische Spoorweg Maatschappij (NIS) and opened to the public in 1871. This station is used as a stopover between Surakarta and Ngayogyakarta and is also used to distribute gunny and sugar sacks. from Delanggu sugar factory to various sugar factories in Vorstenlanden and to the port in Samarang.

Initially, the station likely had four rail lines with line 2 being a straight line. Since the operation of the double track Yogyakarta–Solo segment of the – segment in 2001 and the – segment were completed on 15 December 2003, line 2 has been used as a straight line towards Yogyakarta. As of 2005–2006, line 3 of these stations has completely become a straight line towards Solo.

To support the double tracks operation, the mechanical signaling system at this station was replaced with an electric signaling system made by PT Len Industri which had been installed since 2013 and then started operation in December 2015.

Starting 10 February 2021, to coincide with the launch of the 2021 train travel chart, this station together with three other stations (Ceper Station, Gawok Station, and Srowot Station) began serving KRL Commuterline across Yogyakarta–Solo.

Services
The following is a list of train services at the Delanggu Station.

References

External links 
 

Klaten Regency
Railway stations in Central Java
Railway stations opened in 1871